The Wildpark Bad Mergentheim is a zoo that was founded in 1973.

The park features a variety of wild fauna indigenous to the region, as well as domesticated animals such as cattle, goats, and horses.

References

External links
 

Parks in Germany
Tourist attractions in Baden-Württemberg
Protected areas of Baden-Württemberg
Zoos in Germany
Zoos established in 1973
Wildlife parks
Main-Tauber-Kreis